Teenage Caveman (U.K. title: Out of the Darkness) is an independently made 1958 black-and-white science fiction adventure film drama, produced and directed by Roger Corman, and starring Robert Vaughn and Sarah Marshall. Teenage Caveman was released by American International Pictures in July 1958 as a double feature with How to Make a Monster.

The film was originally filmed under the title Prehistoric World and some 8x10 publicity stills retained the original title; AIP later changed it. Years later, Corman stated in an interview, "I never directed a film called Teenage Caveman". Lead actor Vaughn stated in an interview that he considered Teenage Caveman to be the worst film ever made. It was later featured on the mocking television series Mystery Science Theater 3000.

Plot
A tribe of primitive humans live in a barren, rocky wasteland and struggle for survival, despite a lush, plant-filled land on the other side of a nearby river. They refuse to cross the river because of a law that evolved from an ancient tale, warning of a god lurking there who brings death with a single touch.

A young man of the tribe challenges the law and is eventually followed by other male members of his tribe, who fearfully cross the river in order to bring him back. They soon encounter the terrible god, a large, horribly burned but strangely human-like creature. Despite the young man's peace overture to the god, another tribal member, out of fear, lays a trap and stones the creature to death with a large rock; the young man then shoots and kills that tribesman with one of his arrows. The others gather around the now-dead god and discover that the creature is actually a much older man with long white hair. He is wearing some kind of strange, unknown outer garment with a fearful hood. They find another strange thing in the old man's possession; they are puzzled by this flat, thick object that opens and contains mysterious markings and vivid black, white and gray images that show an even stranger human world unknown to them.

In a surprising denouement provided by the old man after his death, the truth is revealed in voice-over as the tribesmen leaf through his book. He was actually a survivor of a long-ago nuclear holocaust, forced to live for decades inside his now-ragged, discolored and bulky radiation suit (which is implied to have once been covered with deadly radioactive fallout). The old man has wandered the land for decades, while the primitive remnants of a devastated human race have slowly increased their numbers; his frightening outer appearance caused them to fear and shun him.

A final, cautionary question is asked in voice-over by the old man: will humanity someday repeat its nuclear folly after civilization has once again risen to its former heights?

Reception
Corman thought the film to be pretty good, but felt it could have been "genuinely good" had he had more time and more money. Variety found the film to be a good exploitation item aimed at the teen market. The Hollywood Reporter disliked the film and cited the film's low budget as a reason. Monthly Film Bulletin said the film tried hard, but was ultimately unsuccessful.

The L.A. Times found it to be a good movie despite its title.

Cast
 Robert Vaughn as Symbol Maker's Teenage Son
 Darah Marshall as Blonde Maiden
 Leslie Bradley as Symbol Maker
 Frank De Kova as Black-Bearded One
 Charles Thompson as Tribe Member
 June Jocelyn as Symbol Maker's Wife
 Jonathan Haze as Curly-Haired Boy
 Beach Dickerson as Fair-Haired Boy / Man from Burning Plains / Tom Tom Player / Bear
 Ed Nelson as Blonde Tribe Member
 Robert Shayne as Fire Maker
 Marshall Bradford as Tribe Member
 Joseph H. Hamilton as Tribe Member

Production
Teenage Caveman was budgeted at $70,000.

Filming took place in May 1958 under the title Prehistoric World.

It was theatrically released in July 1958.

While a number of scripts were considered to meet American International's directive to do a historic picture, Corman used Bob Campbell's idea of setting the movie in the future. Corman and Campbell both disliked the Teenage Caveman title selected by American International, preferring their choice of Prehistoric World as the name of the movie.

Home media
The film was released on DVD by Lionsgate Home Entertainment on April 18, 2006 as part of a two-disc set with The Saga of the Viking Women and Their Voyage to the Waters of the Great Sea Serpent on the first disc.

Mystery Science Theater 3000
Teenage Caveman was featured in episode 315 of Mystery Science Theater 3000, along with the shorts Aquatic Wizards and Catching Trouble. The episode debuted November 9, 1991, on Comedy Central. MST3K writer Mary Jo Pehl struggled "to find a positive thing to say about Teenage Caveman", in which Vaughn appeared to play "a thirty-something teenage caveman", and  called Corman "a horrible director...[who] wasn't trying to make good films, just films that came in under budget".

The MST3K version of Teenage Caveman was included as part of the Mystery Science Theater 3000 Volume XXXV DVD collection, released by Shout! Factory on March 29, 2016.

See also
 Survival film, about the film genre, with a list of related films

References

Sources

External links

Review of film at Variety

1958 films
1950s English-language films
American International Pictures films
1950s fantasy films
1950s science fiction films
American monster movies
1950s monster movies
Films about dinosaurs
American post-apocalyptic films
Films directed by Roger Corman
Films about cavemen
Films produced by Roger Corman
Films scored by Albert Glasser
Films with screenplays by Robert Wright Campbell
1950s American films